Swamp Creek is a perennial stream of the Mitchell River catchment, located in the Alpine and East Gippsland regions of the Australian state of Victoria.

Features and location
The creek flows generally south by southeast, before reaching its confluence with the Wentworth and Wonnangatta rivers to form the Mitchell River north of the Mitchell River National Park, in the Shire of East Gippsland. The creek descends  over its  course.

See also

 List of rivers in Australia

References

External links
 
 

East Gippsland catchment
Rivers of Gippsland (region)
Victorian Alps